Månsdotter is a Swedish patronymic ('Daughter of Måns´) that has been part of the name of
Cecilia Månsdotter (c. 1476–1523), Swedish noblewoman
Ebba Lilliehöök (Månsdotter, 1529–1609), Swedish noblewoman
Karin Månsdotter (1550–1612), Queen of Sweden
Karin Månsdotter (film), a 1954 Swedish historical drama film 

Swedish-language surnames